Gemmula alwyni is a species of sea snail, a marine gastropod mollusk in the family Turridae, the turrids.

Description
The length of the shell attains 81.8 mm, its diameter 29.7 mm.

Distribution
This marine species occurs off KwaZulu-Natal, north to the Mozambique Channel, South Africa.

References

External links
  Kilburn, R.N. (2005). New species of Drilliidae and Turridae from southern Africa (Mollusca: Gastropoda: Conoidea). African Invertebrates. 46: 85-92

alwyni
Gastropods described in 2005